The Ringhoffer Inscription is located near Tower Arch in Arches National Park. The inscription commemorates the claimed discovery of Tower Arch by Alex Ringhoffer, who was one of the principal advocates for national park designation in the Arches region.

Discovered BY MR. AND MRS. ALEX RINGHOFFER AND SONS 1922-3 

The inscription is incised into the sandstone rock. The site includes Tower Arch and was placed on the National Register of Historic Places on October 6, 1988.

References

1923 establishments in Utah
20th-century inscriptions
National Register of Historic Places in Arches National Park